Aaron John Elling (born May 31, 1978 in Waconia, Minnesota) is a former American football placekicker. He was signed by the Minnesota Vikings as an undrafted free agent in 2002. He played college football at Wyoming.

Elling has also been a member of the Tennessee Titans, Baltimore Ravens, Atlanta Falcons, Jacksonville Jaguars, Cincinnati Bengals and the Oakland Raiders.

Early years
Born in Waconia, his family moved to Wyoming in his childhood. During his high school studies at Lander Valley High, he was a speaker at numerous events and was a player in the soccer team with whom he won two All-State honors.

College career
Elling attended George Fox University where he played soccer his freshman year. He then transferred to the University of Wyoming where he walked on the football team. Majoring in exercise physiology at Wyoming, he planned to attend Pacific University to study optometry.

Professional career

Minnesota Vikings
He signed for the Miami Dolphins as a college free agent on May 7, 2002 but was waived on August 27.

In 2003, Elling signed with the Vikings as a free agent and played in all 16 games scoring 102 points. He made his NFL debut against the Green Bay Packers on September 7. He was waived by the Vikings on September 2, 2004.

Tennessee Titans
Elling signed with the Tennessee Titans on September 10, 2004 and in the season opener he scored five points and played as both kicker and punter. He was then waived by the Titans.

Minnesota Vikings (second stint)
Elling re-signed as a free agent by the Vikings on September 17, 2004. He suffered a broken ankle against the Indianapolis Colts and was placed on season-ending injured reserve. He was waived by the Vikings on September 6, 2005. In his two stints with the Viking he had a 72 field goal percentage, hitting 18 of 25 attempts.

Baltimore Ravens

Elling signed with the Baltimore Ravens as a free agent on September 27, 2005 and played in nine games. He was waived by the team on September 1, 2006.

Atlanta Falcons
On March 22, 2007, Elling signed with the Atlanta Falcons. He was cut on August 6.

Jacksonville Jaguars
Elling was signed by the Jaguars on August 10, 2007 as a free agent but was then released.

Cincinnati Bengals
Elling was then signed by the Cincinnati Bengals during the 2007 preseason. However, in his preseason debut, he tore a ligament in his knee attempting to make a tackle on kickoff, and was released on September 2.

Oakland Raiders
On August 8, 2008, Elling was signed by the Oakland Raiders to fill in for Sebastian Janikowski in the preseason. Offensive tackle Mark Wilson was placed on injured reserve to make room for Elling.  He was cut on August 26.

References

External links
Oakland Raiders bio

1978 births
Living people
People from Waconia, Minnesota
George Fox University alumni
Wyoming Cowboys football players
Pacific University alumni
Minnesota Vikings players
Tennessee Titans players
Baltimore Ravens players
Atlanta Falcons players
Jacksonville Jaguars players
Cincinnati Bengals players
Oakland Raiders players